Prince Christian may refer to:

Living people 
Prince Christian of Denmark (born 2005), son of Crown Prince Frederik of Denmark and Crown Princess Mary of Denmark
Prince Christian of Hanover (born 1985)

Deceased people 
Christian, Duke of Augustenborg (1798–1869), father of Prince Christian of Schleswig-Holstein, husband of Princess Helena of the United Kingdom
Prince Christian of Schleswig-Holstein (1831–1917), husband of Princess Helena of the United Kingdom
Prince Christian Victor of Schleswig-Holstein (1867–1900), son of the above, favourite grandson of Victoria of the United Kingdom
Prince Christian of Schaumburg-Lippe (1898–1974), son of Princess Louise of Denmark, younger sister of Christian X of Denmark
Christian August, Prince of Anhalt-Zerbst (1690–1747), father of Catherine II of Russia
Christian August of Holstein-Gottorp, Prince of Eutin (1673–1726), Duke of Schleswig-Holstein and Prince of the Holy Roman Empire

European royalty